Geeklog is open-source software that works as a Weblog, CMS or Web Portal." It is written in PHP and during its history has supported MySQL, PostgreSQL, or Microsoft SQL Server as a database backend.

History
Geeklog has historically focused on "performance, privacy, and security." In March 2010, the Geeklog project slogan was changed to "The secure CMS." in an effort to more accurately reflect the differentiating features compared to other content management systems. Other Geeklog features include "comments, polls, calendar, web links, content syndication, and more." Geeklog supports the Trackback and Pingback standards as well as content syndication by way of the automatic publication of RSS Feeds. Geeklog (in a manner similar to Movable Type and pMachine) allows one to "set fine-grained permission levels for each individual user." Geeklog is also "easily extensible via a modules API." 

Many web hosting companies "automatically install open source blogging applications like Geeklog" "as part of their basic Web site packages." As such, it is "one of the more popular choices for a Web-based Content Management System along with WordPress and Drupal." Geeklog is available to many webmasters since it is included with the commercial web hosting software installers Fantastico, Softaculous, and Installatron that are bundled with many web hosting plans, although installations of Geeklog via these third-party installers may have support issues.

Geeklog is still under active development, as evidenced by its acceptance as a mentor organization into the Google Summer of Code

for years 2007,
2008,
2009,
and 2010. Geeklog is the content management system used by notable web sites such as Groklaw and Mac OS X Hints which have been in continuous operation since 2003 and 2000, respectively.

References

External links 
 Official site
 Official wiki
 Official documentation
 Example of a United Kingdom based web  hosting provider offering Geeklog for free

Free content management systems
Blog software
Content management systems
Free software programmed in PHP